Madhavapatnam is situated at a distance of 5 km from Kakinada town and lies in East Godavari district, in Andhra Pradesh State. It's a growing village from different parameters day by day its population is raising. 60 % of the village natives occupation is agriculture and agriculture labour. mostly according caste wise this village is BC populated area. 30% percent of the people are Christians but none of them are registered as Christians for the govt policies.

References

Villages in East Godavari district